Erna Bürger (26 July 1909 – 26 June 1958) was a German gymnast. She competed at the 1936 Summer Olympics and won a team gold medal.

References

1909 births
1958 deaths
German female artistic gymnasts
Olympic gymnasts of Germany
Gymnasts at the 1936 Summer Olympics
Olympic gold medalists for Germany
Olympic medalists in gymnastics
Medalists at the 1936 Summer Olympics
People from Eberswalde
Sportspeople from Brandenburg